The R.J.W. Douglas Medal is presented annually by the Canadian Society of Petroleum Geologists in recognition of outstanding contributions to the understanding of sedimentary geology in Canada, commending major contributions to regional tectonics, petroleum and structural geology. The award is open to all geologists who follow the example of R. J. W. Douglas in contributing to the development of Canadian sedimentary, petroleum and structural geology.

Recipients
Source: CSPG

See also

 List of geology awards

External links
CSPG Awards

Canadian science and technology awards
Geology awards